is Japanese animator. She has been involved with TMS Entertainment and many of Studio Ghibli's works. She is a member of the Japanese Animation Creators Association (JAniCA).

She is best known for her work on Lupin the Third, Little Nemo: Adventures in Slumberland, Animaniacs, Princess Mononoke, The New Batman Adventures, Spirited Away, Sonic X, Howl's Moving Castle, and Ponyo.

Works
 The Castle of Cagliostro (1979) – key animator
 Lupin the 3rd (1977-1980) key animator
 The New Adventures of Gigantor (1980-1981) – key animator "The Dreaded Double Robot"
 Jarinko Chie (1981) – animator
 Sugata Sanshirô (1981) – key animator
 Enchanted Journey (1981) – animator
 Space Cobra (1982-1983) – animator / Telecom Animation Film
 Here Come the Littles (1985) – key animator
 Sherlock Hound (1984-1985) – animator
 Galaxy High (1986) – key animator
 DuckTales (1987-1990) – key animator "Lost Crown of Genghis Khan" (uncredited)
 The Fuma Conspiracy (1987) – key animator
 Little Nemo: Adventures in Slumberland (1989) – key animator
 Fox's Peter Pan & the Pirates (1990-1991) – animation director "The Dream" / TMS
 Tiny Toon Adventures: How I Spent My Vacation (1992) – key animator / TMS
 Adventures of Sonic the Hedgehog (1993) – animation director "Robotnik's Pyramid Scheme"
 Animaniacs (1993-1998) – animation director / Tokyo Movie Shinsha Co. Ltd.
 Pom Poko (1994) – animator / Telecom Animation Film
 Whisper of the Heart (1995) – key animato r/ Telecom Animation Film
 Pinky and the Brain (1995-1998) – animation director "A Pinky and the Brain Christmas" / TMS Kyokjichi Corporation
 The Sylvester & Tweety Mysteries (1995-2002) – animation director / key animator / Tokyo Movie Shinsha Co. Ltd.
 Superman: The Animated Series (1996-2000) – storyboard artist / key animator
 Princess Mononoke (1997) – key animator / Telecom Animation Film
 The New Batman Adventures (1997-1999) – Director / storyboard artist / key animator
 Cybersix (1999) – Storyboard / Director / key animator
 Wakko's Wish (1999) – key animator (uncredited)
 Batman Beyond: Return of the Joker (2000) – key animator
 Spirited Away (2001) – Animation Supervisor / Telecom Animation Film
 WXIII: Patlabor the Movie 3 (2002) – animator
 Sonic X (2003-2005) – key animator "Dr. Eggman's Ambition"
 Hajime no Ippo: The Champion Road (2003) – key animator
 Howl's Moving Castle (2004) – Animator
 Monmon the Water Spider (2006) – animation director
 Tales from Earthsea (2006) – key animator
 Ponyo (2008) – key animator
 Green Lantern: First Flight (2009) – key animator
 Summer Wars (2009) – key animator
 Arrietty (2010) – key animator
 Pandane to Tamago Hime (2010) – key animator
 From Up on Poppy Hill (2011) – key animator
 The Wind Rises (2013) – key animator / Telecom Animation Film
 Space Dandy (2014) – key animator "The Search for the Phantom Space Ramen, Baby"
 When Marnie Was There (2014) – key animator
 The Boy and the Beast (2015) – key animator
 Your Name (2016) – key animator
 Mary and the Witch's Flower (2017) – key animator
 Mirai (2018) – key animator

References

External links
 
 
 The Women Behind Ghibli 

Japanese animators
Living people
Year of birth missing (living people)
Japanese women animators